Bastardi is a 2008 Italian film directed by Federico Del Zoppo and Andres Alce Meldonado.

Cast 
 Franco Nero: René Iuvara 
 Barbara Bouchet: Carmen Iuvara 
 Don Johnson: Sante Patene 
 Giancarlo Giannini: il Gatto/Carlo 
 Éva Henger: Lenka 
 Enrico Montesano: don Alfonso/Armando 
 Massimiliano Caroletti: Luca Iuvara 
 Diego Conte: Alessandro Patene 
 Pietro Genuardi: Marco Iuvara 
 Mercédesz Henger: Orsola Iuvara 
 Massimo Vanni: Brasi 
 Riccardo Barbera: zio Oscar 
 Terry Schiavo: Elisa 
 Miriana Trevisan: Amalia

References

External links

2008 films
Italian comedy films
2008 comedy films
2000s Italian films